Hamworthy Recreation Football Club is a football club based in Merley, England. They are currently members of the Wessex League and play at Magna Road.

History
Hamworthy Recreation Football Club was formed in 1948 as Hamworthy Engineering FC and played on the Sports Ground opposite the factory at Fleetsbridge in Poole (where the Tesco supermarket now stands). When the site at Fleetsbridge was sold to Tesco in the late 1980’s the football, along with the Sports & Social Club, moved to its current home at Magna Road, Canford Magna. At that time ‘Hamworthy Engineering FC’ were playing in the Bournemouth League (Division 1). The 2001-01 season saw the Club change its name to Hamworthy Recreation FC to reflect the name of their current headquarters. In May 2022, the club earned promotion to the Wessex League.

Team Honours

 2000-01  Dorset Combination Champions
 2001-02  Dorset Combination Champions (2nd time)
 2004-05  Dorset Premier League Champions (3rd time)
 2009-10  Dorset Premier League Champions (4th time)
 2010-11  Dorset Premier League Champions (5th time)
 2011-12  Dorset Premier League runner-up
 2014-15  Dorset Premier League Champions (6th time)

References

External links
Official club website
Listing on Dorset Premier Football League

 
Football clubs in Dorset
Wessex Football League
Association football clubs established in 1948
1948 establishments in England
Football clubs in England